Zbyslava of Kiev (1085/90 – c. 1114), was a Kievan Rus' princess member of the Rurikid dynasty and by marriage Duchess of Poland.

She was the daughter of Sviatopolk II, Grand Prince of Kiev by his first wife, who according to some historians was a Premyslid princess.

Life
During his fight against his half-brother Zbigniew, the Junior Duke of Poland, Bolesław III Wrymouth, allied himself with Kievan Rus' and Hungary. In order to seal his alliance with the Grand Prince of Kiev, Bolesław III was betrothed to his eldest daughter Zbyslava. The Primary Chronicle names Zbyslava, daughter of Svyatopolk when recording that she was taken to Poland on 16 November 1102 to marry Bolesław III. Thus, the marriage took place between that date or in early 1103. They had only one known son, the future Władysław II the Exile, born in 1105, and a daughter (perhaps named Judith), born around 1111 and later wife of Vsevolod Davidovich, Prince of Murom.

Her date of death is uncertain, however, a wide scientific discussion over the death of Zbyslava was presented in the work of K. Kollinger. One year later (in 1115), Bolesław III married Salomea, daughter of Henry, Count of Berg-Schelklingen.

References

1080s births
1110s deaths
Year of birth uncertain
Year of death uncertain
Rurik dynasty
Polish queens consort
Kievan Rus' princesses
11th-century Rus' women
11th-century Rus' people
11th-century Polish people
11th-century Polish women